Pittsburgh South Side was an American basketball team based in Pittsburgh, Pennsylvania that was a member of the Central Basketball League and the various incarnations of the Western Pennsylvania Basketball League.  Some argue that it was the best all-white professional team in Western Pennsylvania of all time. It twice defeated the famous Buffalo Germans, whose proud boast it was that they never lost a series to any team. The team dropped out of the league late in the 1911–12 season.

The South Siders won the Western Pennsylvania League championship in 1904 and 1913.  They were co-champions of the Central League in 1905.

Joseph "Joe" Meech Leithead (born July 17, 1882; died July 2, 1958 ) played and served as coach and captain of the Pittsburgh South Side team from 1899 through 1907.

The South Side team made national headlines when they made Harry Hough the highest-paid basketball player in the world on December 31, 1907.  They signed him to a contract that paid him $300 per month to play eight league games per month (that's roughly $6,819 a month or $81,800 a year in 2009 dollars past to present currency converter).

South Side Team 1905-06 
Joe Leithead Captain and Coach seated second row left in turtleneck.

Year-by-year

Defunct basketball teams in Pennsylvania
Basketball teams in Pittsburgh
South Side